Shaheed Fazil Rahu Tehsil is a tehsil in Badin district, Pakistan. Sardar Kamal Khan Chang is National assembly member from this tehsil. Largest city in tehsil is Shaheed Fazil Rahu formally called Golarchi.

References

Populated places in Badin District
Talukas of Sindh
Tehsils of Sindh